Ladera is a census-designated place (CDP) in southern San Mateo County, California, adjacent to Portola Valley.  Primarily a residential community, it comprises approximately 520 homes, governed by the Ladera Community Association. The ZIP Code is 94028 and the community is inside area code 650. The population was 1,557 at the 2020 census.

Geography 
Ladera is located at the bottom of the eastern slope of the Peninsula Range of the Santa Cruz Mountains. It is bordered on the west by the Jasper Ridge Biological Preserve operated by Stanford University, on the east by Alpine Road, and on the north by Webb Ranch.

According to the United States Census Bureau, the CDP covers an area of 0.4 square miles (1.1 km), all of it land.

History 
The Ramaytush Ohlone peoples occupied the land that is now the community of Ladera, prior to the settlement of California by the Spanish.  Ladera is located on the Rancho Corte de Madera Mexican land grant.

The land was used for grazing and timber through 1927 when it was joined to the Ormondale Ranch, owned by the Macdonough family.  The Macdonoughs raised cattle and sheep, and bred racehorses; their most famous stud, Ormonde, had raced in England and never lost a race.  In the 1930s, the majority of the Ormondale Ranch land was developed and incorporated into Portola Valley.

In 1944, the Peninsula Housing Association (PHA) was formed with the goal of purchasing a tract of land and developing a housing cooperative.  Several prominent members of the Stanford and Palo Alto communities joined to develop the fledgling PHA co-op.  It began subscribing members in 1945 and its 150 members purchased the remaining  of the former Ormondale ranch for $155,000 on July 31, 1946. The co-op selected noted landscape architect Garrett Eckbo to lay out the design for the new community. Architects Joseph Allen Stein and John Funk were chosen to design several of the earliest model homes.

The members chose the name Ladera (over alternatives Lark Hills and New Rochdale) to reflect the Spanish history of the land — ladera is Spanish for hillside.  Streets are Spanish phrases or botanical names.  Early members of the cooperative included author Wallace Stegner and Klystron tube inventor Sigurd Varian of Varian Associates.  (Varian had grown up in Halcyon, another intentional community in southern California.)

The PHA refused to place restrictive covenants on title deeds. However, the Federal Housing Administration would not insure loans to co-ops that included African American members - an example of redlining. Banks would not finance loans or issue mortgages without government approval, so the PHA failed due to financial difficulties after only a few houses had been constructed.  The co-op proposed the inclusion of a quota system, promising that the proportion of African American members would not exceed the proportion of African Americans in California's overall population. This stipulation was not sufficient for the government. The land was later sold to Hare, Brewer, and Kelley, who completed the development. Directly following completion, single family homes in the development were only sold to whites. Four non-white families were required to sell their land.  These types of provisions were mostly legally unenforceable after Shelley v. Kraemer (1948) though they continued to be added and privately unenforceable after the Fair Housing Act of 1968 (see  Housing discrimination in the United States).

In November 2021, following a two-and-a-half-month petition drive that achieved signatures from owners of 391 of the 534 properties in Ladera, the clause forbidding residency by people "other than those of the Caucasian or white race" was replaced by the statement: "By provisions outlined in this document the Ladera Community has formally acted to remove the Race Restriction that previously comprised this subsection, and by so doing asserts that the Ladera Community supports diversity, equity, and inclusion."

Demographics

The 2010 United States Census reported that Ladera had a population of 1,426. The racial makeup of Ladera was 1,269 (89.0%) White, 3 (0.2%) African American, 1 (0.1%) Native American, 98 (6.9%) Asian, 0 (0.0%) Pacific Islander, 5 (0.4%) from other races, and 50 (3.5%) from two or more races. Hispanic or Latino of any race were 33 persons (2.3%).

The Census reported that 1,426 people (100% of the population) lived in households, 0 (0%) lived in non-institutionalized group quarters, and 0 (0%) were institutionalized.

There were 525 households, out of which 207 (39.4%) had children under the age of 18 living in them, 392 (74.7%) were opposite-sex married couples living together, 24 (4.6%) had a female householder with no husband present, 6 (1.1%) had a male householder with no wife present.  There were 10 (1.9%) unmarried opposite-sex partnerships, and 7 (1.3%) same-sex married couples or partnerships. 86 households (16.4%) were made up of individuals, and 53 (10.1%) had someone living alone who was 65 years of age or older. The average household size was 2.72.  There were 422 families (80.4% of all households); the average family size was 3.05.

The population was spread out, with 405 people (28.4%) under the age of 18, 43 people (3.0%) aged 18 to 24, 243 people (17.0%) aged 25 to 44, 443 people (31.1%) aged 45 to 64, and 292 people (20.5%) who were 65 years of age or older.  The median age was 46.0 years. For every 100 females, there were 94.5 males.  For every 100 females age 18 and over, there were 90.1 males.

The homeowner vacancy rate was 0.2%; the rental vacancy rate was 2.2%.  1,312 people (92.0% of the population) lived in owner-occupied housing units and 114 people (8.0%) lived in rental housing units.

According to Business Insider,  Ladera is the most educated town in the United States.

Political and economic
As an unincorporated area, Ladera lies in the sphere of influence of Portola Valley.  It draws its police services from the County of San Mateo and is a part of Woodside Fire District.

School districts that serve Ladera include the Las Lomitas Elementary School District for elementary and middle school and the Sequoia Union High School District for high school.  The local school in the community is leased to the private Woodland School.

Along Alpine Road are two small commercial developments: a small shopping center to the north of La Mesa and an office complex south of La Mesa.

Notes

External links 

 Ladera Community Association
 Woodside Fire District

Census-designated places in San Mateo County, California
Census-designated places in California
Silicon Valley